NewsCenter or variant NewsCentre, is a brand that has been used by many broadcasting entities to refer to its regular newscasts.

In particular, "NewsCenter" may refer to:

 WNBC-TV, in New York using "NewsCenter 4" in the 1970s
 WESH-TV in Orlando, using "NewsCenter 2" from the 1980s to 1991
 WJKW later WJW (TV) in Cleveland using NewsCenter 8 from 1978 to 1995
 WSVN in Miami, using "NewsCenter 7" from February 1980 to 1988
 WCSH in Portland, Maine, along with Bangor satellite station WLBZ
 WCVB-TV in Boston, using "NewsCenter 5" since its sign on in 1972
 KGUN-TV in Tucson, using "NewsCenter 9" during the 1970s and 1980s
 KMTV-TV in Omaha, using "NewsCenter 3" in the 1980s and 1990s
 KJRH-TV in Tulsa, using "NewsCenter 2" in the 1970s and 1980s
 WDSU-TV in New Orleans, which used "NewsCenter 6" from June 1, 1978 thru 1987
 WTHR-TV in Indianapolis, which used the hybrid brand "Eyewitness NewsCenter 13" from 1976 to 1979
 KKTV in Colorado Springs, Colorado using "NewsCenter 11" from 1979 until 1989        
 KTTC in Rochester, Minnesota
KNBN in Rapid City, South Dakota
 KOA-TV later KCNC-TV in Denver, Colorado using NewsCenter 4 from 1980 until 1989
 NotiCentro, the branding of the news division of San Juan, Puerto Rico station WAPA-TV
 "News Centre Nine", Australia
 "News Centre Six", BTV/GMV Australia
 NewsCenter 7 at Dayton, Ohio's WHIO-TV, since the 1970s
 Common Dreams NewsCenter
 KHBS/KHOG-TV in Fort Smith, Arkansas
 WECT in Wilmington, NC used “Newscenter 6” in the 1980s and “WECT NewsCenter” 1989 until 1993.
 WRGB in Schenectady, NY used "NewsCenter 6"